P'ohang-guyŏk is a district of the 7 kuyŏk that constitute Chongjin, North Hamgyong Province, North Korea.

Administrative divisions 
Pohang-guyok is divided into 14 neighbourhoods (tong).

References 

Districts of Chongjin